The 1907 San Diego mayoral election was held on April 2, 1907 to elect the mayor for San Diego. John F. Forward Sr. was elected mayor with a plurality of the votes.

Candidates
John F. Forward Sr., businessman
Grant Conard
Ricard V. Dodge
George A. Garrett

Campaign
Incumbent Mayor John L. Sehon declined to run for reelection and instead endorsed Republican Grant Conard on the Non-Partisan ticket. Also contesting the race were John F. Forward Sr. on the official Republican ticket, Richard V. Dodge, a Democrat, and George A. Garrett, a Socialist.

On April 2, 1907, Forward was elected mayor with a plurality of 39.3 percent of the vote compared to 32.0 percent for Conard. Dodge came in third with 23.9 percent, and Garrett finished last with 4.7 percent.

Election results

References

1907
1907 California elections
1907 United States mayoral elections
1907
April 1907 events